JR Theatres was a chain of cinemas in the Baltimore metropolitan region. Now defunct, it was one of the largest movie theatre chains in Maryland between the 1950s and the 1980s. At its height, JF Theatres owned over 50 movie theatres, including all of the major cinemas in Baltimore, including the Royal Theatre and what is now the Charles Theatre.

History
JF Theatres was founded and owned by Jack Fruchtman Sr., an office manager and chief accountant at the Washington, D.C. office of Paramount Pictures. Fruchtman was born on Manhattan's Lower East Side, the son of Polish-Jewish immigrants. Fruchtman's wife Goluem K. Bragg and their son Jack Fruchtman, Jr. were also involved in the family business. Publicity for JF Theatres was managed by Herbert A. Schwartz. Following white flight to the suburbs in the 1960s, movie attendance fell at JF Theatres. An avowed liberal, Fruchtman began to cater to Black audiences. During the 1960s and 1970s, Fruchtman helped make Baltimore a major market for blaxploitation films.

The Royal Theatre in Baltimore, then owned by JF Theatres, was damaged during the Baltimore riot of 1968. Physical damage to facilities owned by JF Theatres was generally mimimal. However, according to the film historian Robert Headley, the "psychic damage to the theater going public was terrible" and a wave of cinemas closed in the following decade.

Former JF Theatres facilities
AMC Lexington Park 6, Lexington Park, Maryland
Charles Theatre, Baltimore
NextAct Cinema at the Pikes, Pikesville, Maryland

Demolished structures
Avalon Theatre, Baltimore
Loews Northpoint Plaza 4, Baltimore
Royal Theatre, Baltimore
Sun Valley 6 of Pasadena, Maryland

References

African-American history in Baltimore
Cinemas and movie theaters in Maryland
Jews and Judaism in Baltimore
Movie theatre chains in the United States